A Citizenship Act (or a variant thereof) is a piece of legislation, used to regulate citizenship within a country. 
Many countries have, or have had, laws bearing the name.

List of Citizenship Acts

 Australia: Australian Citizenship Act 1948, replaced by the Australian Citizenship Act 2007
 Bhutan:
 Bhutanese Citizenship Act 1958
 Bhutanese Citizenship Act 1985
 Canada:
 Canadian Citizenship Act, 1946
 Canadian Citizenship Act, 1977
 India: Citizenship Act, 1955
 Ireland: there have been several Irish Nationality and Citizenship Acts in Irish nationality law
 New Zealand: British Nationality and New Zealand Citizenship Act 1948
 Slovakia: Citizenship Act (Slovakia)
 South Africa: Bantu Homelands Citizenship Act, 1970, subsequently renamed the Black States Citizenship Act, 1970, and repealed in 1994
 Sri Lanka (Ceylon): Ceylon Citizenship Act, 1948
 United Kingdom: Nationality and Citizenship Act 1948
 United States:
Indian Citizenship Act, 1924
Child Citizenship Act of 2000
Citizenship Reform Act of 2005
US Citizenship Act of 2021

See also

Citizenship